Time Flies is the seventh studio album, by country music artist Billy Ray Cyrus. His only release for the Madacy label, it produced the singles "What Else Is There", "Bread Alone", and "Back to Memphis". Also included is an acoustic rendition of the title track to Cyrus's 1992 debut album Some Gave All.

The track "She Don't Love Me (She Don't Hate Me)" was later recorded by Trent Willmon on his 2004 self-titled debut album, and by Blake Shelton on his 2007 album Pure BS. Both of these versions were titled "She Don't Love Me".

The track "Stand Still" was used as the theme song for the TV show "DOC".

Track listing

Charts

Album

Singles

2003 albums
Billy Ray Cyrus albums
Madacy Entertainment albums